Yoshioyama Osamu (born 20 May 1949 as Osamu Yoshimura) is a former sumo wrestler from Yatsushiro, Kumamoto, Japan. He made his professional debut in March 1965 and reached the top division in November 1969. His highest rank was maegashira 2. Upon retirement from active competition he became an elder in the Japan Sumo Association under the name  Onogawa. He left the Sumo Association in January 1977.

Career record

See also
Glossary of sumo terms
List of past sumo wrestlers
List of sumo tournament second division champions

References

1949 births
Living people
Japanese sumo wrestlers
People from Yatsushiro, Kumamoto
Sumo people from Kumamoto Prefecture